Popovka may refer to:

Inhabited localities
Popovka, Belgorod Oblast, a village (selo) in Russia
Popovka, a village (selo) in Zainsky District of the Republic of Tatarstan
Popovka, Kharovsky District, Vologda Oblast, a village in Russia, abolished in 2000.
Popovka, Rossoshansky District, Voronezh Oblast, a village (selo) in Russia
Popovka, Ternovsky District, Voronezh Oblast, a village (selo) in Russia
Shakhty, a city in Rostov Oblast, Russia, called Popovka before 1881

Rivers and streams
Popovka (Kolyma), a tributary of the Kolyma in far eastern Russia  

Ship types
Popovka, a nickname for a pair of Imperial Russian warships designed by Admiral Andrei Alexandrovich Popov, including Russian monitor Novgorod

See also
Popov
Popovo (disambiguation)